Ricochet Rabbit & Droop-a-Long was a segment of Hanna-Barbera's 1964–1966 cartoon The Magilla Gorilla Show, and later appeared on The Peter Potamus Show.

Background
Taking place in a Wild West setting, Ricochet Rabbit (voiced by Don Messick) worked as a sheriff in the town of Hoop 'n' Holler. Ricochet would bounce off stationary objects yelling "Bing-bing-bing!" His deputy and foil Droop-a-Long Coyote (voiced by Mel Blanc impersonating Ken Curtis) was not as fast and was very clumsy.

In addition to his speed, which enabled him to outrun bullets, Ricochet used trick bullets against his opponents, including a bullet that would stop in mid-flight and strike the target with an impossibly oversized mallet, and another which would draw a target on his nose and punch it.

Episode list

Cast
 Don Messick as Ricochet Rabbit
 Mel Blanc as Droop-a-Long Coyote

Other appearances
 An early incarnation of Ricochet Rabbit appears in Touché Turtle and Dum Dum episode 26 "Rapid Rabbit".
 Ricochet Rabbit and Droop-a-Long were seen in Yogi's Ark Lark.
 Ricochet Rabbit and Droop-a-Long were seen in the opening title of Yogi's Gang.
 Ricochet Rabbit made some appearances in Yogi's Treasure Hunt.
 Ricochet Rabbit makes a portrait cameo in the "Agent Penny" episode of the "Super Secret Secret Squirrel" segment of 2 Stupid Dogs.
 Ricochet Rabbit appears in the Harvey Birdman, Attorney at Law episode "X Gets the Crest", voiced by Mark Hamill. Droop-a-Long also makes a non-speaking cameo.
 Ricochet Rabbit appears in the Wacky Races episode "Slow and Steady", voiced by Tom Kenny.
 Ricochet Rabbit and Droop-a-Long will both appear in Jellystone!.

In other languages
 Italian: Tornado Kid e Sonnacchia
 Français: Ricochet-Va-Vite et Lambinousse
 Dutch: Sheriff Altijd Raak Hebbes

See also
 List of works produced by Hanna-Barbera Productions
 List of Hanna-Barbera characters

References

External links
 Ricochet Rabbit & Droop-a-Long episode guide on BCDB
 Ricochet Rabbit at Don Markstein's Toonopedia. Archived from the original on January 14, 2017.

Hanna-Barbera characters
Animated television series about rabbits and hares
Fictional coyotes
1960s American animated television series
1964 American television series debuts
1966 American television series endings
Television series by Hanna-Barbera
Western (genre) peace officers
American children's animated comedy television series
First-run syndicated television programs in the United States
Television series by Screen Gems
Fictional characters who can move at superhuman speeds